The Scourge of God is a 1920 Austrian film directed by Michael Curtiz. It was the sequel to The Star of Damascus.

Cast
 Lucy Doraine
 Anton Tiller
 Svetozar Petrov

See also
 Michael Curtiz filmography

External links

Films directed by Michael Curtiz
1920 films
Austrian black-and-white films
Austrian silent feature films